Last Expedition is a Macedonian alternative rock band, formed in 1985 by brothers Sead and Enis Hadžić.

History 
The band was formed in 1985, in the Đorče Petrov municipality of Skopje, with Dimitar Petrov on drums, Enis Hadzic on bass, Sead Hadzic on guitar and Idriz Ameti on vocals. Their first recorded song, "Maršira propasta" (The March of Destruction) appeared on the compilation Demoskop 1 in 1990. In 1991, they won in the annual MRTV Pop Rock Fest and appeared on the official compilation the following year with the track "Daleku" (Far Away), which was rerecorded at the end of that year and appeared on the album Intro in 1993.

In 1994, they signed to MRTV and recorded their second album Izgubeni likovi, which was released that year. In 1997, they released BoX, their final release with original material to date, on the Promo Siemens label. In 2001, they released their final release to date, Live A1.

The group is still active.

Discography 
 Intro (1993)
 Izgubeni likovi (1994)
 BoX (1997)
 Live A1 (2001)

Macedonian rock music groups
Macedonian alternative rock groups
Musical groups established in 1985
1985 establishments in Yugoslavia